Ashleigh Barty and Demi Schuurs are the defending champions but they chose not to participate together. Barty played alongside Victoria Azarenka, but lost in the semifinals to Barbora Krejčíková and Kateřina Siniaková.

Krejčíková and Siniaková went on to win the title, defeating Schuurs and Anna-Lena Grönefeld in the final, 7–5, 6–0.

Seeds
The top four seeds received byes into the second round.

Draw

Finals

Top half

Bottom half

References
Main Draw

Women's Doubles